J. K. Ihalainen (born 6 January 1957 in Tampere) is a Finnish poet and recipient of the Eino Leino Prize in 2010.

References

Finnish male poets
Recipients of the Eino Leino Prize
1957 births
Living people
Finnish publishers (people)
People from Tampere
21st-century Finnish poets